

Selected list of festivals celebrated by GSBs

The other festivals unique to GSB's are-

Kodial Teru- Held during January–February on the auspicious day of Ratha Sapthami. Procession of Lord Venkataramana in Mangalore.
Karkala Teru- Procession of Lord Venkataramana in Karkala.
Karkala Karthipunav-Sri Venkataramana and Sri Srinivas god procession to vhana and vhana bhojan
Mulki Ramanavami Teru, mulki pratiste punav
Bantwal Teru
Manjeshwar Shasti Mahotsav. (Nov-Dec) Margashira Shuddha Pratipada to Saptami (7 days) 
Katapady Teru(Katapady Rahotsav)- Held during January–February, two days after Kodial Teru on the auspicious day of Madhwanavami. The festival last for a week prior to the Teru
Shri Mahamaya Rathotsava- Held in Mangalore.
 Honavar teru - Procession of Lord Rama in Honavar occur during March - April
 Kumta teru - Procession of Lord Venkataramana on the auspicious day of Ratha sapthami in Kumta (normally held during January February)

References 

Festivals